HMS Unity was a 42-gun fourth-rate ship of the line of the English Royal Navy, formerly the Dutch warship Eendracht, captured from the Dutch on 22 February 1665 by the English warships Yarmouth, Diamond and Mermaid.

Unity was commissioned on 1665 under Captain Thomas Trafford. In 1667 she became a guard ship at Sheerness, but was recaptured by the Dutch warship Vrede during the Raid on the Medway in June 1667.

Notes

References

Ships of the line of the Royal Navy
Captured ships